{{Infobox person
| name               = Pat McDonald
| image              = Number96 25.jpg
| caption            = Pat McDonald pictured right with Bunney Brooke, in Number 96
| birth_name         = Patricia Ethell McDonald
| birth_date         = 
| birth_place        = Elwood, Victoria, Australia
| death_date         = 
| death_place        = Royal North Shore Hospital
| occupation         = Actor
| years_active       = 1939–1989
| spouse             = 
| children           = 
| partner            = Bunney Brooke
| known for          = Number 96, Sons and Daughters
| awards             = 4 Logie Awards (1 Gold 1974)
}}
Patricia Ethell McDonald (1 August 1921 – 10 March 1990) was an Australian radio actor and actor of stage and television and the daughter of one of Australia's most prominent electric radio engineers and public servants, Arthur Stephen McDonald and his wife, milliner Edith Roseina Ethell. Her grandfather, bootmaker John McDonald, was born in Victoria, and married Eliza Mary Stevenson. Although she was not the first female Gold Logie winner in Australia, which was entertainer and TV host Lorrae Desmond, she was the first female character actor to win for serial Number 96.

Number 96 and Sons and Daughters
McDonald was best-known for two long-running soap opera roles. She played comical malaproping gossip Dorrie Evans in the popular serial Number 96 between 1972 and 1977 and then played Aunty Fiona Thompson in Sons and Daughters between 1981 to 1987. She was featured in both shows throughout their entire run, about five and a half years in each case. McDonald won four Logie awards, including the 1974 Gold Logie, for her work on Number 96.

Career
McDonald was born in 1921, and at the age of 18 acted in the 1939 Australian film Seven Little Australians based on the novel by English children's literary writer Ethel Turner she played the twenty-year-old stepmother Esther. She much later appeared in an episode of the 1970 police drama The Long Arm. The role in Number 96 followed; she reprised the role in the 1974 feature film version of the series. McDonald won several Logie Awards as Best Actress for playing Dorrie, and a Gold Logie for Australia's most popular female personality in 1974. After Number 96 she played a regular role in the short-lived Australian situation comedy series The Tea Ladies (1978).

One of McDonald's final TV appearances was at the Logie Awards on 17 March 1989, when she took part in a production number called "Golden Girls", which celebrated female Gold Logie winners of years past.  She performed the song with Lorrae Desmond, Hazel Phillips, Denise Drysdale, Jeanne Little, and Rowena Wallace.

McDonald, apart from being a staple of film and television since the late 1930s, had also been a regular theatre performer from 1940 until 1989. Later in 1989 McDonald appeared in an episode of the hit British TV series In Sickness and in Health in which she played Raeline's mother. The episode aired in the UK in October 1989.

Personal life
McDonald was married in 1941 to Captain Peter Hendry, a son of a reverend and doctor in the Australian Army.

During the 1970s she was involved in a live-in lesbian relationship with Number 96'' co-star Bunney Brooke. The two actors openly appeared in magazine articles about the suburban Sydney home (eastern end of Fox Valley Road, Wahroonga) they shared, and they freely discussed their international summer holidays together in press articles, although the true nature of the relationship was not explicitly stated.

McDonald died after a lengthy illness of cancer of the pancreas at Royal North Shore Hospital, Sydney, on 10 March 1990, aged 68. Her partner, actor and casting agent Bunney Brooke, died ten years later.

Awards

Filmography

Movies

Television

References

External links

Australian film actresses
Deaths from cancer in New South Wales
Gold Logie winners
1921 births
1990 deaths
Deaths from pancreatic cancer
Australian lesbian actresses
Actresses from Melbourne
Australian stage actresses
20th-century Australian actresses
Australian soap opera actresses
20th-century Australian LGBT people
People from Elwood, Victoria